Faustino Domínguez (5 May 1905 – April 1981) was a Spanish equestrian. He competed in two events at the 1956 Summer Olympics.

References

1905 births
1981 deaths
Spanish male equestrians
Olympic equestrians of Spain
Equestrians at the 1956 Summer Olympics
Sportspeople from A Coruña